Mohamed "Moha" Hamdoud (born June 9, 1976 in El Biar, Alger, Algeria) is an Algerian former football player.

Club career

International career

Career statistics

Club

Honours
 Won the Algerian League four times with USM Alger in 1996, 2002, 2003 and 2005
 Won the Algerian Cup five times with USM Alger in 1997, 1999, 2001, 2003 and 2004
 Semi-finalist in the African Champions League twice with USM Alger in 1997 and 2003
 Runner-up in the Algerian League three times with USM Alger in 1998, 2001 and 2004
 Finalist in the Algerian Cup two times with USM Alger in 2006 and 2007
 Has 5 caps for the Algerian National Team

References

External links
 

1976 births
Living people
Algerian footballers
Algeria international footballers
USM Alger players
Paradou AC players
JS El Biar players
People from El Biar
Algeria under-23 international footballers
Association football defenders
Competitors at the 1997 Mediterranean Games
Mediterranean Games competitors for Algeria
21st-century Algerian people